"Look Up to the Sky" is the 36th single by Japanese singer Yōko Oginome. Written by Ua and Shinichi Osawa, the single was released on March 21, 1997, by Victor Entertainment.

Background and release
Oginome had the idea of collaborating with Shinichi Osawa after listening to a CD of Ōsawa's band Mondo Grosso, and she wanted a similar groove to her next musical project. "Look Up to the Sky" was written by Ua, who was pregnant with her first son Nijirō Murakami at the time.

Track listing

References

External links

1997 singles
Yōko Oginome songs
Japanese-language songs
Victor Entertainment singles